Kolotovka is the name of several rural localities in Russia.

Kolotovka, Chelyabinsk Oblast, a village in Varlamovsky Selsoviet of Chebarkulsky District in Chelyabinsk Oblast
Kolotovka, Irkutsk Oblast, a settlement in Mamsko-Chuysky District of Irkutsk Oblast
Kolotovka, Kaluga Oblast, a village in Lyudinovsky District of Kaluga Oblast
Kolotovka, Pskov Oblast, a village in Kunyinsky District of Pskov Oblast
Kolotovka, Smolensk Oblast, a village in Yefremovskoye Rural Settlement of Vyazemsky District in Smolensk Oblast